The following highways are numbered 691:

United States